"Fine Line" is a song from Paul McCartney's 2005 album, Chaos and Creation in the Backyard. McCartney plays a majority of the instruments on the song including drums, bass, and piano. It was released 29 August 2005 as the first single from the album in the UK (see 2005 in British music). It reached number 20 on the UK Singles Chart, McCartney's last top 20 solo single in the UK as of 2019, and number 31 on the US Adult Contemporary. The cover art is a drawing by British artist and frequent McCartney collaborator Brian Clarke.

A live version is also featured on The Space Within US concert DVD from 2006.

Track listings
7" R6673
"Fine Line" – 3:05
"Growing Up Falling Down" – 3:27
CD CDR6673
"Fine Line" – 3:05
"Comfort of Love" – 3:08
CD
 "Fine Line" – 3:06
 "Comfort of Love" – 3:09
 "Growing Up Falling Down" – 3:27

Charts

Personnel
Personnel per booklet.
Paul McCartney – vocals, Bösendorfer grand piano, Baldwin spinet, Höfner bass guitar, Epiphone Casino electric guitar, Martin D28 acoustic guitar, Ludwig drums, shakers, tambourine
Millennia Ensemble – strings
Joby Talbot – conducting, arrangement

References

2005 singles
Paul McCartney songs
Parlophone singles
Oricon International Singles Chart number-one singles
Songs written by Paul McCartney
Song recordings produced by Nigel Godrich
2005 songs